Juan Ignacio Aranda (born Juan Ignacio López Aranda on February 6, 1962, in Mexico City, Mexico) is a Mexican actor. He began his training in 1978 in Centro de Arte Dramático (CADAC), also studied in The Cockpit Arts Workshop and in The City Lit (London), in Centro Universitario de Teatro of Universidad Nacional Autónoma de México (UNAM) and in United States International University in San Diego, California.

Filmography

Film roles

Television roles

References

External links

1962 births
Living people
Mexican male telenovela actors
Mexican male television actors
Mexican male film actors
Male actors from Mexico City
20th-century Mexican male actors
21st-century Mexican male actors